Anbe Aaruyire is a 1975 Indian Tamil-language romantic comedy film, directed by A. C. Tirulokchandar. The film stars Sivaji Ganesan and Manjula. It was released on 26 September 1975. The film is a remake of the 1967 Telugu film Gruhalakshmi.

Plot

R. Sattanathan, a leading criminal lawyer and Bangalore Ramaswamy, his professional competitor, were once friends but now enemies. Sattanathan has vowed that he will win a case against Ramaswamy at least once in his lifetime, for which he even makes his son Saravanan study law, so that if not him at least his son will defeat Ramaswamy. But contrary to Sattanathan's expectation, Saravanan falls in love with Ramaswamy's daughter Devi. Helping them in their love is Ramesh, Ramaswamy's nephew. A lot of hilarious incidents and confusions follow before the lovers are united.

Cast
 Sivaji Ganesan as Saravanan
 Manjula as Sridevi/Devi
 Major Sundarrajan as Advocate Sattanathan
 V. K. Ramasamy as Advocate Bangalore Ramasamy
 K. A. Thangavelu as Hotel Manager
 Nagesh as Ramesh
 Suruli Rajan as Suruli
 Manorama as Alamelu
 Sukumari as Janaki
 Ganthimathi as Meenakshi
 Pushpamala as stage actress
 Vennira Aadai Moorthy as Saibhu (Guest role)
 Y. G. Mahendra as Lawrence (Guest role)
 T. S. B. K. Moulee as Alamelu's husband (Guest role)
 S. Rama Rao as Sattanathan's Assistant
 Padmini as Appi, Alamelu's daughter
 Dasarathan as Pandu, Hotel room boy
 Chandran Babu as Taxi driver

Soundtrack
The music was composed by M. S. Viswanathan, with lyrics by Vaali.

Reception 
A critic from Film World wrote, "Anbe Aaruyirey could have been a fine comedy if Sivaji didn't work in it and the script had avoided vulgar scenes. It was quite painful to watch Sivaji making faces and behaving like Rishi Kapoor. For most part the camera concentrated on Manjula's inadequate bosom and her navel". Kanthan of Kalki said Tirulokchandar did not utilise his direction and writing well.

References

External links
 

1975 romantic comedy films
1970s Tamil-language films
1975 films
Films directed by A. C. Tirulokchandar
Films scored by M. S. Viswanathan
Films set in Chennai
Indian romantic comedy films
Tamil remakes of Telugu films